An Adobe Certified Expert (ACE) is a person who has demonstrated proficiency with Adobe Systems software products by passing one or more product-specific proficiency exams set by Adobe.

Adobe currently sets one levels of proficiency of Single product certification (i.e. Photoshop CS5).

in the past, Adobe has also set other levels of proficiency such as:

 Specialist certification in a specific medium (print, web or video)
 Master certification recognizes certification for an entire product suite

Self study
Recommended preparation for ACE exams is the "Classroom in a Book" series of self-paced training workbooks.

External links
 Adobe Support: Adobe Certified Expert (ACE)
 Adobe Authorised Training Providers offer accredited Adobe product training in your area.

Adobe Inc.
Information technology qualifications